Emil Ganter was a Swiss footballer who played for FC Basel. He played mainly in the position as defender, but also as midfielder.

Football career
Between the years 1916 and 1919 Ganter played a total of 28 games for Basel scoring a total of four goals. 19 of these games were in the Swiss Serie A  and the other nine were friendly games. He scored all his four goals in the domestic league.

References

Sources
 Rotblau: Jahrbuch Saison 2017/2018. Publisher: FC Basel Marketing AG. 
 Die ersten 125 Jahre. Publisher: Josef Zindel im Friedrich Reinhardt Verlag, Basel. 
 Verein "Basler Fussballarchiv" Homepage

FC Basel players
Swiss men's footballers
Association football defenders
Association football midfielders
Year of birth missing
Year of death missing